Awadhesh Pratap Singh University Stadium is a multi purpose stadium in Rewa, Madhya Pradesh. The ground is mainly used for organizing matches of football, cricket and other sports. The stadium has hosted a Ranji Trophy match in 1970 when Madhya Pradesh cricket team played against Uttar Pradesh cricket team. but since then the stadium is regular of hosted non-first-class matches.

References

External links 
 cricketarchive
 cricinfo

Rewa, Madhya Pradesh
Sports venues in Madhya Pradesh
Cricket grounds in Madhya Pradesh
Sports venues completed in 1983
1983 establishments in Madhya Pradesh
University sports venues in India
Football venues in Madhya Pradesh
20th-century architecture in India